Gustav Albert Schwalbe, M.D. (1 August 1844 – 23 April 1916) was a German anatomist and anthropologist from Quedlinburg.

He was educated at the universities of Berlin, Zurich, and Bonn (M.D. 1866), he became in 1870 privat-docent at the University of Halle, in 1871 privatdozent and prosector at the University of Freiburg in Baden, in 1872 assistant professor at the University of Leipzig, and then professor of anatomy successively at the universities of Jena (1873), Königsberg (1881), and Strassburg (1883) — at that time a German university, Alsace having been annexed to Germany. There he died.

Known for his anthropological research of primitive man, Schwalbe considered the Neanderthal to be a direct ancestor of modern humans. Much to the dismay of the Dutch paleontologist Eugène Dubois (1858–1940) who had discovered Java Man, Schwalbe published in 1899 the influential treatise Studien über Pithecantropus Erectus (Study of Pithecantropus Erectus).

In 1869 Schwalbe injected Berlin-blue dye into the subarachnoid space of a dog, and was the first to demonstrate that the major pathways to absorb cerebrospinal fluid were lymphatic pathways. The subarachnoid or subdural spaces between the internal and external sheaths of the optic nerve are now referred to as "Schwalbe's spaces"; also called the intervaginal spaces of optic nerve (spatia intervaginalia nervi optici). His name is lent to several other anatomical structures, including "Schwalbe's nucleus" or the vestibular nucleus; "Schwalbe's ring", which is a circular ridge consisting of collagenous fibers surrounding the outer margin of Descemet's membrane; and "Schwalbe's line", an anatomical line located on the posterior surface of the eye's cornea. He was the first to describe Paneth cells in the Archiv für mikroskopische Anatomie in 1872; he described them 16 years before Joseph Paneth. Paneth even acknowledged Schwalbe and used one of his drawings in his article that was published in the same journal. </Ref Wehkamp J, Stange EF. Paneth’s disease. J Crohns Colitis. 2010;4:523–531 https://academic.oup.com/ecco-jcc/article/4/5/523/2366438?login=true </Ref/>

Literary works 
 an editor of the Jahresberichte für Anatomie und Entwicklungsgeschichte.
 an editor of the Zeitschrift für Morphologie und Anthropologie.
 He edited also the second edition of Hoffmann's Lehrbuch der Anatomie des Menschen (Erlangen, 1877–81).

and is the author of:
 Lehrbuch der Neurologie (Textbook of neurology) ib. 1881
 Ueber die Kaliberverhältnisse der Nervenfasern, (About caliber conditions of nerve fibers) Leipzig, 1882
 Lehrbuch der Anatomie der Sinnesorgane (Textbook on the anatomy of sensory organs), Erlangen, 1886
 Studien über Pithecantropus Erectus (Study of Pithecantropus Erectus), Leipzig, 1899
 Der Neander Schädel (The Neanderthal skull) ib. 1901
 Vorgeschichte der Menschen (Prehistory of humans) ib. 1903.

References

 Mondofacto Dictionary (definition of eponyms) 
 Neanderthal Meets Modern Man 
 Cerebrospinal Fluid Research  Integration of the subarachnoid space and lymphatics

External links
 "Gustav Schwalbe."  In Online Biographical Dictionary of the History of Paleoanthropology. Edited by Matthew R. Goodrum. (2016) available at https://drive.google.com/file/d/12w1bxrUYqTXYgRf1ko6lbH7HnTTu115w/view
 
 

1844 births
1916 deaths
German anthropologists
German anatomists
19th-century German Jews
People from Quedlinburg
People from the Province of Saxony
Humboldt University of Berlin alumni
University of Bonn alumni
Academic staff of the Martin Luther University of Halle-Wittenberg
Academic staff of the University of Freiburg
Academic staff of Leipzig University
Academic staff of the University of Jena
Academic staff of the University of Königsberg
Academic staff of the University of Strasbourg
Members of the Royal Society of Sciences in Uppsala